Kiev Viceroyalty was created in the process of the Catherine's reform initiated by hers November 7, 1775 edict when the new administrative unit namestnichestvo (viceroyalty) was introduced.

Description
On September 16, 1781, an edict was issued to transform the Governorate into a Viceroyalty (Kievskoye namestnichestvo), with the effective date of January 9, 1782. The Viceroyalty was subdivided into the following counties (uyezds): 
 Kiev (Kyiv)
 Gorodishche
 Goltva
 Khorol
 Kozelets
 Lubny
 Mirgorod
 Ostyor
 Pereyaslavl
 Piryatin
 Zolotonosha 

Note that some sources state that the towns of Khorol and Gorodishche were included without their districts.

In 1789, Gorodishche county was transferred to the Yekaterinoslav Governorate. In 1791, the Kiev Viceroyalty was subdivided into ten okrugs and in early 1790s additional districts (uyezds) of Bohuslav, Gadyach, Kaniv, Zinkiv, Korsun, and Lokhvytsia were added.

On June 4, 1782, the Coat of Arms of Kiev was officially approved, which de facto became a Coat of Arms of the Viceroyalty. According to the description, Archangel Michael is dressed in silver holding up an aglow sword, depicted on an azure shield.

Governors of Viceroyalty

Governor-Generals (Viceroys) 
 1782—1796 — Petr Rumyantsev
 1791—1793 — Mikhail Krechetnikov, (acting)
 1793—1794 — Osip Igelstrom, (acting)

Viceroyalty governors 
 1782—1795 — Semen Shirkov
 1796 — 17.06.1797 Vasiliy Krasno-Milashevich

References

1775 establishments in the Russian Empire
1796 disestablishments in the Russian Empire
History of Kyiv
Viceroyalties of the Russian Empire